was a town located in Minamiuonuma District, Niigata Prefecture, Japan.

The town was established as a village in 1956, and was elevated to a town in 1962.

As of 2003, the town had an estimated population of 15,195 and a density of 116.07 persons per km². The total area was 130.91 km².

On November 1, 2004, Yamato, along with the town of Muikamachi (also from Minamiuonuma District), was merged to create the city of Minamiuonuma.

External links
 Minamiuonuma official website 

Dissolved municipalities of Niigata Prefecture
Minamiuonuma